The Kansas Jayhawks women's basketball team represents the University of Kansas and competes in the Big 12 Conference of NCAA Division I. The Jayhawks are coached by Brandon Schneider. The Jayhawks have failed to match the success of the men's team, only qualifying for 13 NCAA Tournaments and never making it past the Sweet Sixteen. Despite the lack of success on the court, the Jayhawks have produced one Naismith Memorial Basketball Hall of Famer, Lynette Woodard

History

Kansas first officially fielded a varsity women's basketball team during the 1968–1969 season, though women's teams had been fielded as early as 1903. For 31 seasons (1973–2004) the women's team was coached by Marian Washington, who led the team to three Big Eight championships, 11 NCAA Tournament appearances and three AIAW tournament appearances. The team's best post-season result was appearing in the Sweet Sixteen, which they have done five times, most recently in 2013.

Notable players

Former players and coaches in the Basketball Hall of Fame
 Lynette Woodard, player and coach

Former WNBA players
 Angela Aycock, Forward, Seattle Storm
 Tamecka Dixon, Guard, Los Angeles Sparks
 Angel Goodrich, Guard, Tulsa Shock
 Jaclyn Johnson, Forward, Orlando Miracle
 Danielle McCray, Guard/Forward, Connecticut Sun
 Lynn Pride, Guard/Forward, Minnesota Lynx
 Charisse Sampson, Guard, Seattle Storm

Conferences 
The Jayhawks and the rest of the Big 8, along with four former members of the defunct Southwest Conference, joined and created the Big 12 conference in 1996.

Coaches 

* Women's college post-season tournaments did not begin until 1969, with a CIAW invitational tournament.  Kansas appeared in the 1971 CIAW post-season qualification tournament with a record of 2-2.

NCAA/AIAW Tournament history
The Jayhawks have appeared in 17 NCAA/AIAW Tournaments. Their combined record is 13–16.

Year by year results

|-style="background: #ffffdd;"
| colspan="8" align="center" | Big Eight Conference

|-style="background: #ffffdd;"
| colspan="8" align="center" | Big 12 Conference

References

External links 
 

 
1968 establishments in Kansas
Basketball teams established in 1968